Leaders Club is the basketball department of Notre Dame University – Louaize , a university basketball club basked in Zouk Mosbeh. The club was established in the founding year of 1978 and is participating in the 2022 Lebanese Basketball League.

Men's basketball program

The men's basketball team in the summer of 2015 won the second division basketball tournament and was promoted to the 2016 Lebanese Basketball League.

The Lebanese Second Division basketball championship came to an end, with Louaize grabbing the title by defeating Antranik 3-1 in the final series.

Squad

Depth chart

Achievements
Lebanese Division 2
Winners (1): 2015
Syrian Basketball Super Cup
Quarterfinals: 2022

Women's basketball program
The Louaize women's basketball program competes in various combined college competitions in Lebanon and is currently developing progressively alongside the men's team in the hopes of qualifying for division 1.

See also
Notre Dame University – Louaize

External links
http://basketball.asia-basket.com/team/Lebanon/Louaize/20476?Page=1

Basketball teams in Lebanon
Sport in Beirut
Keserwan District
1978 establishments in Lebanon
Basketball teams established in 1978